Alishewanella tabrizica is a Gram-negative, aerobic, rod-shaped and motile bacterium from the genus of Alishewanella which has been isolated from water from the Qurugöl Lake from Tabriz in Iran.

References

Bacteria described in 2012
Alteromonadales